Lee Jin-sung (born February 27, 1985), better known by the stage name Monday Kiz, is a South Korean singer and former member of Monday Kiz. He released his first album as a solo artist on May 3, 2016. Originally a duo of Lee Jin-sung and Kim Min-su, it was disbanded on August 4, 2008 when Kim Min-soo died in a motorcycle accident on April 29, 2008. It was re-engaged as a trio in April 2010.

Discography

Extended plays

Singles

References

1985 births
Living people
21st-century South Korean  male singers